

This is a list of the National Register of Historic Places listings in Moody County, South Dakota.

This is intended to be a complete list of the properties on the National Register of Historic Places in Moody County, South Dakota, United States. The locations of National Register properties for which the latitude and longitude coordinates are included below, may be seen in a map.

There are 16 properties listed on the National Register in the county. Another 3 properties were once listed but have been removed.

Current listings

|}

Former listings

|}

See also
 List of National Historic Landmarks in South Dakota
 National Register of Historic Places listings in South Dakota

References

 
Moody County
Buildings and structures in Moody County, South Dakota